Saurolophinae is a subfamily of hadrosaurid dinosaurs. It has since the mid-20th century generally been called the Hadrosaurinae, a group of largely non-crested hadrosaurs related to the crested sub-family Lambeosaurinae. However, the name Hadrosaurinae is based on the genus Hadrosaurus which was found in more recent studies to be more primitive than either lambeosaurines or other traditional "hadrosaurines", like Edmontosaurus and Saurolophus. As a result of this, the name Hadrosaurinae was dropped or restricted to Hadrosaurus alone, and the subfamily comprising the traditional "hadrosaurines" was renamed the Saurolophinae. Recent phylogenetic work by Hai Xing indicates that Hadrosaurus is placed within the monophyletic group containing all non-lambeosaurine hadrosaurids. Under this view, the traditional Hadrosaurinae is resurrected, with the Hadrosauridae being divided into two clades: Hadrosaurinae and Lambeosaurinae.

Saurolophinae was first defined as a clade in a 2010 phylogenetic analysis by Prieto-Márquez. Traditionally, the "crestless" branch of the family Hadrosauridae had been named Hadrosaurinae. However, the use of the term Hadrosaurinae was questioned in a comprehensive study of hadrosaurid relationships by Albert Prieto-Márquez in 2010. Prieto-Márquez noted that, though the name Hadrosaurinae had been used for the clade of mostly crestless hadrosaurids by nearly all previous studies, its type species, Hadrosaurus foulkii, has almost always been excluded from the clade that bears its name, in violation of the rules for naming animals set out by the ICZN. Prieto-Márquez (2010) defined Hadrosaurinae as only the lineage containing H. foulkii, and used the name Saurolophinae instead for the traditional grouping.

The cladogram below follows Godefroit et al. (2012) analysis.

The following cladogram was recovered in the 2013 phylogenetic analysis by Prieto-Márquez (the relationships within Lambeosaurinae and between basal hadrosauroids aren't shown).

See also

 Timeline of hadrosaur research

References

 
Cretaceous dinosaurs
Taxa named by Lawrence Lambe